is a Japanese modern pentathlete. At the 2012 Summer Olympics, she competed in the women's competition, finishing in 30th place.

References

External links
 GSDF profile 

Japanese female modern pentathletes
1990 births
Living people
Sportspeople from Kōchi Prefecture
Olympic modern pentathletes of Japan
Modern pentathletes at the 2012 Summer Olympics
Japan Ground Self-Defense Force personnel
Asian Games medalists in modern pentathlon
Modern pentathletes at the 2014 Asian Games
Medalists at the 2014 Asian Games
Asian Games silver medalists for Japan
20th-century Japanese women
21st-century Japanese women